Haji Rahimni bin Haji Pundut (born 5 January 1987) is a Bruneian footballer who plays for Setia Perdana FC in the Brunei Super League as a striker. Due to a typing error, his patronym is mistakenly referred to as Pundat.

Career

Rahimni previously played for professional club Brunei DPMM FC in the 2009 S.League season, DPMM's first and eventful season in Singapore after withdrawing from the Malaysia Super League. He only saw one minute of playing time, against Sengkang Punggol on 6 July. He was on the bench for the final of the 2009 Singapore League Cup, picking up a winner's medal as DPMM won the game 4–3 on penalties after a 1–1 draw in extra time.

Rahimni moved to Setia Perdana in 2011 for the Brunei National Football League, a competition ran by the newly established National Football Association of Brunei Darussalam to determine the teams for a new league that was to become the 2012–13 Brunei Super League. His club finished third in the one-off league, placing them in the 2014 Brunei Premier League.

On 31 May 2015, Rahimni scored a three-minute hattrick in a 4-2 victory against Kasuka FC, a feat possibly yet to be equalled in Bruneian football. Rahimni finished the 2015 season as top scorer for the Brunei Premier League with 16 goals.

Rahimni scored a total of seven goals to lift Setia Perdana to first place in the 2017 Brunei Premier League. This brought promotion for Setia to the 2018–19 Brunei Super League.

Honours

Team
DPMM FC
Singapore League Cup: 2009

Setia Perdana
Brunei Premier League: 2017

Individual
2015 Brunei Premier League top scorer - 16 goals

References

External links

1987 births
Living people
Association football forwards
Bruneian footballers
DPMM FC players